Papyrus 118, designated by  (in the Gregory-Aland numbering of New Testament manuscripts), is a copy of a small part of the New Testament in Greek. It is a papyrus manuscript of the Epistle to the Romans. The surviving text of Romans is verses 15:26-27,32-33; 16:1,4-7,11-12. The manuscript is in a fragmentary condition. Using the study of comparative writing styles (paleography), the manuscript has been dated by the INTF to the 3rd century CE.

 Text 
The Greek text of this codex is too small to determine its textual character. 

 Location 
The codex is currently housed at the Institut für Altertumskunde of the University of Cologne at Cologne, with the shelf number (Inv. No. 10311).

See also 
 List of New Testament papyri
 Epistle to the Romans: chapter 15 and 16

References

Further reading 

 G. Schenke, Kölner Papyri 10 (2003), pp. 33–37.

Images 
 Papyrus 118 at the Kölner Papyrus-sammlung
 Image from 𝔓118 recto, fragment of Romans 15:26-27,32-33 
 Image from 𝔓118 verso, fragment of Romans 16:1,4-7,11-12

External links 
 "Continuation of the Manuscript List" Institute for New Testament Textual Research, University of Münster. Retrieved April 9, 2008 

New Testament papyri
3rd-century biblical manuscripts
Early Greek manuscripts of the New Testament
Epistle to the Romans papyri